Montenegrin is a normative variety of the Serbo-Croatian language mainly used by Montenegrins and is the official language of Montenegro. Montenegrin is based on the most widespread dialect of Serbo-Croatian, Shtokavian, more specifically on Eastern Herzegovinian, which is also the basis of Standard Croatian, Serbian, and Bosnian.

Montenegro's language has historically and traditionally been called either Serbian or Montenegrin. The idea of a standardized Montenegrin standard language separate from Serbian appeared in the 1990s during the breakup of Yugoslavia, through proponents of Montenegrin independence from the State Union of Serbia and Montenegro. Montenegrin became the official language of Montenegro with the ratification of a new constitution on 22 October 2007.

Language standardization 
In January 2008, the government of Montenegro formed the Board (Council) for Standardization of the Montenegrin Language, which aims to standardize the Montenegrin language according to international norms. Proceeding documents will, after verification, become a part of the educational programme in Montenegrin schools.

The first Montenegrin standard was officially proposed in July 2009. The Ministry of Education has accepted neither of the two drafts of the Council for the Standardization of the Montenegrin language, but instead adopted an alternate third one which was not a part of their work. The Council has criticized this act, saying it comes from "a small group" and that it contains an abundance of "methodological, conceptual and linguistic errors".

On 21 June 2010, the Council for General Education adopted the first Montenegrin Grammar.

The first written request for the assignment of an international code was submitted to the technical committee ISO 639 in July 2008, with complete paperwork forwarded to Washington in September 2015. After a long procedure, the request was finally approved on Friday, December 8, 2017 and ISO 639-2 and -3 code [cnr] was assigned to the Montenegrin language, effective December 21, 2017.

Official status and speakers' preference 

The language remains an ongoing issue in Montenegro.

In the census of 1991, the vast majority of Montenegrin citizens, 510,320 or 82.97%, declared themselves speakers of the then-official language: Serbo-Croatian. The earlier 1981 population census had also recorded a Serbo-Croatian-speaking majority. However, in the first Communist censuses, the vast majority of the population declared Serbian to be their native language. Such had also been the case with the first recorded population census in Montenegro, in 1909, when approximately 95% of the population of the Principality of Montenegro claimed Serbian as their native language. According to the Constitution of Montenegro, the official language of the republic since 1992 has been Serbian of the Shtokavian (Ijekavian) standard.

After World War II and until 1992, the official language of Montenegro was Serbo-Croatian. Before that, in the previous Montenegrin realm, the language in use was called Serbian. Serbian was the officially used language in Communist Montenegro until after the 1950 Novi Sad Agreement, and Serbo-Croatian was introduced into the Constitution of the Socialist Republic of Montenegro in 1974. Organizations promoting Montenegrin as a distinct language have appeared since 2004 when the Democratic Party of Socialists of Montenegro regime introduced usage of the term. The new constitution, adopted on 19 October 2007, deemed Montenegrin to be the official language of Montenegro.

The most recent population census conducted in Montenegro was in 2011. According to it, 36.97% of the population (229,251) declared that their native language was Montenegrin, and 42.88% (265,895) declared it to be Serbian.

Mijat Šuković, a prominent Montenegrin lawyer, wrote a draft version of the constitution which passed the parliament's constitutional committee. Šuković suggested that Montenegrin be declared the official language of Montenegro. The Venice Commission, an advisory body of the Council of Europe, had a generally positive attitude towards the draft of the constitution but did not address the language and church issues, calling them symbolic. The new constitution ratified on 19 October 2007 declared Montenegrin to be the official language of Montenegro, but also gave some recognition to Albanian, Bosnian, Croatian, and Serbian.

The ruling Democratic Party of Socialists of Montenegro and Social Democratic Party of Montenegro stand for simply stating the country's official language to be Montenegrin, but this policy is opposed by the Socialist People's Party of Montenegro, the People's Party, the Democratic Serb Party, the Bosniak Party, and the Movement for Changes as well as by the Serb List coalition led by the Serb People's Party. A referendum was not needed, however, as a two-thirds majority of the parliament voted for the Constitution, including the ruling coalition, Movement for Changes, the Bosniaks, and the Liberals, while the pro-Serbian parties voted against it and the Albanian minority parties abstained from voting. The Constitution was ratified and adopted on 19 October 2007, recognizing Montenegrin as the official language of Montenegro.

According to a poll of 1,001 Montenegrin citizens conducted by Matica crnogorska in 2014, the linguistic demographics were:

According to an early 2017 poll, 42.6% of Montenegro's citizens have opted for Serbian as the name of their native language, while 37.9% for Montenegrin.

A declaration of Montenegrin as their native language is not confined to ethnic Montenegrins. According to the 2011 census, a proportion of other ethnic groups in Montenegro have also claimed Montenegrin to be their native language. Most openly, Matica Muslimanska called on Muslims living in Montenegro to name their native language as Montenegrin.

Linguistic considerations 

Montenegrins speak Shtokavian subdialects of Serbo-Croatian, some of which are shared with the neighbouring Slavic nations:

Montenegrin alphabets 

The proponents of the separate Montenegrin language prefer using Gaj's Latin alphabet over the Serbian Cyrillic. In both scripts, the Montenegrin alphabets have two additional letters (bold), which are easier to render in digital typography in the Latin alphabet due to their existence in Polish, but which must be created ad hoc using combining characters when typesetting Cyrillic.

Phonology and grammar

Literature 
Many literary works of authors from Montenegro provide examples of the local Montenegrin vernacular. The medieval literature was mostly written in Old Church Slavonic and its recensions, but most of the 19th century works were written in some of the dialects of Montenegro. They include the folk literature collected by Vuk Stefanović Karadžić and other authors, as well as the books of writers from Montenegro such as Petar Petrović Njegoš's The Mountain Wreath (Gorski vijenac), Marko Miljanov's The Examples of Humanity and Bravery (Primjeri čojstva i junaštva), etc. In the second half of the 19th century and later, the Eastern Herzegovinian dialect, which served as a basis for the standard Serbo-Croatian language, was often used instead of the Zeta–South Raška dialect characteristic of most dialects of Montenegro. Petar Petrović Njegoš, one of the most respectable Montenegrin authors, changed many characteristics of the Zeta–South Raška dialect from the manuscript of his Gorski vijenac to those proposed by Vuk Stefanović Karadžić as a standard for the Serbian language.

For example, most of the accusatives of place used in the Zeta–South Raška dialect were changed by Njegoš to the locatives used in the Serbian standard. Thus the stanzas "U dobro je lako dobar biti, / na muku se poznaju junaci" from the manuscript were changed to "U dobru je lako dobar biti, / na muci se poznaju junaci" in the printed version. Other works of later Montenegrin authors were also often modified to the East Herzegovinian forms in order to follow the Serbian language literary norm. However, some characteristics of the traditional Montenegrin Zeta–South Raška dialect sometimes appeared. For example, the poem Onamo namo by Nikola I Petrović Njegoš, although it was written in the East Herzegovinian Serbian standard, contains several Zeta–South Raška forms: "Onamo namo, za brda ona" (accusative, instead of instrumental case za brdima onim), and "Onamo namo, da viđu (instead of vidim) Prizren", and so on.

Language politics 

Most mainstream politicians and other proponents of the Montenegrin language state that the issue is chiefly one of self-determination and the people's right to call the language what they want, rather than an attempt to artificially create a new language when there is none. The Declaration of the Montenegrin PEN Center states that the "Montenegrin language does not mean a systemically separate language, but just one of four names (Montenegrin, Serbian, Croatian and Bosnian) by which Montenegrins name their part of [the] Shtokavian system, commonly inherited with Muslims, Serbs and Croats". Therefore, in 2017, numerous prominent writers, scientists, journalists, activists and other public figures from Montenegro, Croatia, Bosnia-Herzegovina, and Serbia signed the Declaration on the Common Language, which states that in Montenegro, Croatia, Serbia, and Bosnia-Herzegovina a common polycentric standard language is used, consisting of several standard varieties, such as German, English or Spanish.

The introduction of the Montenegrin language has been supported by other important academic institutions such as the Matica crnogorska, although meeting opposition from the Montenegrin Academy of Sciences and Arts. Some proponents go further. The chief proponent of Montenegrin was Zagreb-educated Dr. Vojislav Nikčević, professor at the Department of Language and Literature at the University of Montenegro and the head of the Institute for Montenegrin Language in the capital Podgorica. His dictionaries and grammars were printed by Croatian publishers since the major Montenegrin publishing houses such as Obod in Cetinje opted for the official nomenclature specified in the Constitution (Serbian until 1974, Serbo-Croatian to 1992, Serbian until 2007). Nikčević advocates amending the Latin alphabet with three letters Ś, Ź, and З and corresponding Cyrillic letters С́, З́ and Ѕ (representing IPA ,  and  respectively).

Opponents acknowledge that these sounds can be heard by many Montenegrin speakers, however, they do not form a language system and thus are allophones rather than phonemes. In addition, there are speakers in Montenegro who do not utter them and speakers of Serbian and Croatian outside of Montenegro (notably in Herzegovina and Bosanska Krajina) who do. In addition, introduction of those letters could pose significant technical difficulties (the Eastern European character encoding ISO/IEC 8859-2 does not contain the letter З, for example, and the corresponding letters were not proposed for Cyrillic).

Prime minister Milo Đukanović declared his open support for the formalization of the Montenegrin language by declaring himself as a speaker of Montenegrin in an October 2004 interview with Belgrade daily Politika. Official Montenegrin government communiqués are given in English and Montenegrin on the government's webpage.

In 2004, the government of Montenegro changed the school curriculum so that the name of the mandatory classes teaching the language was changed from "Serbian language" to "Mother tongue (Serbian, Montenegrin, Croatian, Bosnian)". This change was made, according to the government, in order to better reflect the diversity of languages spoken among citizens in the republic and to protect human rights of non-Serb citizens in Montenegro who declare themselves as speakers of other languages.

This decision resulted in a number of teachers declaring a strike and parents refusing to send their children to schools. The cities affected by the strike included Nikšić, Podgorica, Berane, Pljevlja and Herceg Novi.

The new letters had been used for official documents since 2009 but in February 2017, the Assembly of Montenegro removed them from the official webpage.

Sample text 
Article 1 of the Universal Declaration of Human Rights in Montenegrin, written in the Latin alphabet:

Article 1 of the Universal Declaration of Human Rights in English:
All human beings are born free and equal in dignity and rights. They are endowed with reason and conscience and should act towards one another in a spirit of brotherhood.

See also 

 Comparison of standard Bosnian, Croatian, Montenegrin and Serbian
 Controversy over ethnic and linguistic identity in Montenegro
 Dialects of Serbo-Croatian
 Language secessionism in Serbo-Croatian
 Mutual intelligibility
 Pluricentric Serbo-Croatian language
 Declaration on the Common Language 2017

References 
Notes

References

Further reading 
 
  (COBISS-CG).
 
 
  (COBISS-CG).

External links 

 
 Language on Montenegrina 

 
Serbo-Croatian language
South Slavic languages
Languages of Montenegro
Slavic languages written in Latin script